Hamza Sahli (born 10 May 1993) is a Moroccan athlete competing in long-distance events. He won a bronze medal in half marathon at the 2019 African Games. Representing Morocco at the 2019 World Athletics Championships, he competed in men's marathon and finished 8th.

He competed in the men's marathon at the 2020 Summer Olympics.

References

External links
 
 
 
 

Moroccan male marathon runners
1993 births
Living people
World Athletics Championships athletes for Morocco
African Games medalists in athletics (track and field)
African Games bronze medalists for Morocco
Athletes (track and field) at the 2019 African Games
Athletes (track and field) at the 2020 Summer Olympics
Olympic athletes of Morocco
20th-century Moroccan people
21st-century Moroccan people